Chasing Time is a compilation album, recorded by the Progressive metal group Fates Warning. The album was released on July 25, 1995. It includes 14 songs from all the band's periods, including 1 unreleased remix and 2 unreleased songs. It is the only compilation album the band has released.

Track listing 
"Monument" - 6:15
"The Apparition" - 5:47
"Through Different Eyes" - 4:20
"Point of View" - 4:58
"Prelude to Ruin" - 7:20
"Quietus" - 4:06
"Eye to Eye" - 4:05
"Guardian" - 7:30
"At Fates Fingers" [Previously unreleased] - 4:46
"Silent Cries" - 3:16
"We Only Say Goodbye" [Previously unreleased remix] - 4:50
"Damnation" - 6:22
"Circles" [Previously unreleased] - 5:16
"The Eleventh Hour" - 8:52

 Track 1 is from Inside Out (1994)
 Track 2 is from The Spectre Within (1985)
 Track 3 is from Perfect Symmetry (1989)
 Tracks 4, 7, 11, and 14 are from Parallels (1991)
 Tracks 5 and 8 are from Awaken the Guardian (1986)
 Tracks 6 and 10 are from No Exit (1988)
 Track 9, an instrumental version of "At Fates Hands" from Perfect Symmetry, is from Guitar's Practicing Musicians Vol. 2. (1991)
 Track 12 is from Night on Bröcken (1984)
 Track 13, recorded during the Inside Out sessions, had not appeared elsewhere

References

Fates Warning albums
Chasing Time(compilation)
Metal Blade Records compilation albums